Bashley may refer to:

Bashley, Hampshire, a village in Hampshire, England
Bashley F.C., a football club based at Bashley
Bashley (Rydal) Cricket Club, a cricket club based at Bashley